Sajni (سجنی) is an album by Shaban Yusuf (شعبان یوسف), a national stage artist. The album comprises five audio tracks with different genres written and composed by Shaban Yusuf. Joans Foster is the music director of the album.

Track listing
The full track list was announced at Saavn.com on July 28, 2015.

References

2015 debut albums